ISO 3166-2:CA is the entry for Canada in ISO 3166-2, part of the ISO 3166 standard published by the International Organization for Standardization (ISO), which defines codes for the names of the principal subdivisions (e.g., provinces or states) of all countries coded in ISO 3166-1.

Currently for Canada, ISO 3166-2 codes are defined for 10 provinces and 3 territories.

Each code consists of two parts, separated by a hyphen. The second part is two letters, which is the postal abbreviation for the province or territory.

Current codes
Subdivision names are listed as in the ISO 3166-2 standard published by the ISO 3166 Maintenance Agency (ISO 3166/MA).

ISO 639-1 codes are used to represent subdivision names in the following administrative languages:
 (en): English
 (fr): French

Click on the button in the header to sort each column.

Changes
The following changes to the entry have been announced in newsletters by the ISO 3166/MA since the first publication of ISO 3166-2 in 1998:

See also
 Administrative divisions of Canada
 List of FIPS region codes (A–C)#CA:_Canada

References

External links
 ISO Online Browsing Platform: CA
 Canada Provinces, Statoids.com

2:CA
ISO 3166-2
Lists of Canadian abbreviations